Hans Wahli (11 January 1927 – 4 January 2012) was a Swiss athlete. He competed in the men's high jump at the 1948 Summer Olympics and the 1952 Summer Olympics.

References

1927 births
2012 deaths
Athletes (track and field) at the 1948 Summer Olympics
Athletes (track and field) at the 1952 Summer Olympics
Swiss male high jumpers
Olympic athletes of Switzerland
Place of birth missing